Mullah Mohammad Younus Akhundzada is the current Rural Minister of the Islamic Emirate of Afghanistan.

References

Living people
Taliban government ministers of Afghanistan
Year of birth missing (living people)